John Dart (1837–1910) was the second Bishop of New Westminster. Dart was educated at St Mary Hall, Oxford and ordained in 1861. During his career he was Vice-Principal and Science Lecturer at St Peter's College, Peterborough; Warden of St Thomas's College, Colombo; President of the University of Windsor; and a Canon of Halifax Cathedral.

References

1837 births
Alumni of St Mary Hall, Oxford
Anglican bishops of New Westminster
20th-century Anglican Church of Canada bishops
19th-century Anglican Church of Canada bishops
1910 deaths
Academic staff of University of Windsor
British expatriates in Sri Lanka